Kim Woo-joo (born August 29, 1985) is a South Korean ballad singer, pianist and lyricist. Kim debuted in 2005 with the album "Before you sleep...".

On November 10, 2014, he released his third album "More Softly…" on music sites, marking his 10-year anniversary since his debut.

In April 2015, The Korea Times reported that Seoul court sentenced singer Kim Woo-joo to one year in prison for attempting to evade mandatory military duty by lying about his mental health. In the media spotlight was not Kim, but a hip-hop singer with the same name, also born in 1985.

Discography

Single
"Beautiful Day" (2007)
"Acoustic Love" (2013)
"Farewell Rain" (2013)
"Winter Night" (2014)
"Like" (2014)
"The First Day We Met" (2014)
"Wedding Song" (2015)
"Separate Ways" (2016)
"Dawn in the Wind" (2016)
"Crying Out Love" (2016)
"Summer Stars" (2016)
"Medicine" (2016)
"Rub off (Ft. Slow J)" (2016)
"Broke Up, 5min" (2016)
"Who Did This" (2017)
"ㅇㄱㄹㅇ(Love)" (2017)
"Spring Rain" (2017)

Mini albums
"내마음속에 내리는..." (2013)
"Love You" (2014)
"ROMANTIC" (2015)
"Amante" (2016)

Full albums
"Before you sleep..." (2005)
"이별" (2006)
"More Softly…" (2014)

Original soundtrack
"Distance" (1 km OST Part 1, 2016)
"It's You" (The Shining Eun Soo OST Part 16, 2017)

Collaborations
"Happiness" with Seo Ji-young (2008)
"Farewell Rain" with Han Groo (2013)
"Winter Night" with Yiruma (2014)
"Insomnia" with Space Cowboy (2016)
"Rub Off" with Slow J (2016)

Filmography

Music video

References

External links 
 
 
 

1985 births
Living people
21st-century South Korean male  singers
South Korean male singer-songwriters